Mercury-Atlas 4 was an uncrewed spaceflight of the Mercury program. It was launched on September 13, 1961, at 14:09 UTC from Launch Complex 14 at Cape Canaveral, Florida. A Crewman Simulator instrument package was aboard. The craft orbited the Earth once.

There were a series of delays getting the Atlas and Mercury capsule ready as the postflight findings from MA-3 had necessitated extensive modifications to the booster. Vehicle 88D did not undergo its factory rollout inspection until June 30 and delivery to Cape Canaveral waited until July 15. Moreover, the flight was not going to use Mercury capsule #9 as planned, but instead capsule #8, which had been recovered from the MA3 launch and refurbished. Capsule #8 was also the last of the older models with small port windows, no landing bag, and a heavy locking mechanism on the hatch.

A series of delays occurred due to problems with the Atlas autopilot, including the replacement of a defective yaw rate gyro. Launch was originally intended for August 22 but pushed back. Further delays happened when it was discovered that the brand of transistor used in both the Atlas and Mercury were prone to forming solder balls, thus the entire last week of August was spent laboriously repairing them.

In August, the Soviet Union orbited cosmonaut Gherman Titov in Vostok 2 for a daylong flight, producing stunned disbelief in the US and paranoia in some quarters as Soviet premier Nikita Khrushchev proclaimed in a speech afterwards "We have launched Gagarin and Titov into space, and we can deliver a nuclear weapon to any point on the planet!"

This flight was an orbital test of the Mercury Tracking Network and the first successful orbital flight test of the Mercury program--all previous successful launches were suborbital. The payload consisted of a pilot simulator (to test the environmental controls), two voice tapes (to check the tracking network), a life support system, three cameras, and instrumentation to monitor levels of noise, vibration and radiation. Because it was suspected that a transient voltage caused the malfunction of MA3's programmer (and that a similar problem had been responsible for Big Joe's failure to stage), Convair equipped the autopilot to give the engines a counteracting capability. Thus, testing this was also an objective of the flight. Also, the Atlas vehicle used to launch MIDAS 3 in July had experienced a programmer reset at staging, which did not have any significant effect or prevent the satellite from reaching orbit, but this incident was thoroughly investigated because of the problems with MA-3--one modification to Mercury vehicles would involve removing the programmer's ability to reset itself in flight.

Of continuing concern were rough combustion and gyroscope malfunctions as these failure modes had destroyed two Atlas E vehicles in June. The Spin Motor Rotation Detection System, invented to prevent an Atlas from launching with an improperly operating gyroscope, was just being phased in and would not appear in a Mercury vehicle until MA-5.

The launch went extremely well and the thick-skinned Atlas survived Max Q acceleration. Capsule performance was also good despite some concern over high oxygen usage in orbit, but ground controllers did not consider it a serious problem and the oxygen supply was sufficient for at least 8 orbits. The process of turning the capsule around in orbit so its heat shield faced forward proved more difficult than expected, taking 50 seconds instead of the normal 20 seconds. At a few points during the mission, the capsule's attitude became slightly unstable due to the failure of two thrusters, which caused momentary telemetry dropouts. The capsule completed one orbit prior to returning to Earth. Reentry took place one hour and 28 minutes after launch, and splashdown occurred in the Atlantic Ocean 176 miles (283 kilometers) east of Bermuda. One hour and 22 minutes after splashdown the destroyer  (which was 34 miles from the landing point) picked up the capsule, which was found to be in good condition with little damage from either liftoff, orbit, or reentry. Postflight examination found that the oxygen rate handle had been dislodged by liftoff-induced vibration and cracked open a valve. This had allowed oxygen to escape into space, but not at sufficient rates to trigger a telemetry warning measurement, although it did trigger the oxygen warning light in the capsule. The handle was redesigned afterwards to be more difficult to move. The problem reorienting the capsule after booster separation was found to be the result of an open circuit in the pitch gyro.

The biggest problem encountered on MA-4 was an uncomfortably high level of liftoff vibration from T+5 to T+20 seconds, so a few more small modifications were made to the Atlas's autopilot. However, Manned Spaceflight Center director Bob Gilruth expressed his confidence that the booster was now man-rated, and that a human passenger would have survived the flight. 

The MA4 mission had successfully achieved all its flight objectives. It had demonstrated the ability of the Atlas LV-3B rocket to lift the Mercury capsule into orbit and of the capsule and its systems to operate completely autonomously, and it had succeeded in obtaining pictures of the Earth. Nonetheless, to be on the safe side and test out a few more design changes, NASA still planned for one more uncrewed test before committing the Mercury-Atlas combo to a crewed flight.

See also

Splashdown

References

Project Mercury
Spacecraft launched in 1961
Spacecraft which reentered in 1961
Spacecraft launched by Atlas rockets